Bryzgalov and Bryzgalova (feminine) is a Russian surname. Notable people with the surname include:
 Anastasia Bryzgalova (born 1992), Russian curler
 Dmitry Bryzgalov (born 1991), Russian acrobatic gymnast
 Ilya Bryzgalov (born 1980), Russian ice hockey player
 Sergei Bryzgalov (born 1992), Russian soccer player

Russian-language surnames